The IMAM Ro.5 was a sport aircraft designed by Alessandro Tonini and produced by IMAM in Italy in the late 1920s.

Design and development
The Ro.5 was a conventional, parasol wing monoplane with fixed tailskid undercarriage and two open cockpits in tandem. It proved popular with private owners and flying clubs, and was built in large numbers. Some Ro.5s were purchased by the Regia Aeronautica for use as trainers and liaison aircraft. A later version, the Ro.5bis, enclosed the cockpits under a long canopy.

Operators

Regia Aeronautica

Spanish Air Force

Specifications (Ro.5)

References

Ro.05
1920s Italian sport aircraft
Parasol-wing aircraft
Single-engined tractor aircraft
Aircraft first flown in 1929